Speransky is a rural locality (a village) in Nikolayevsky Selsoviet, Ufimsky District, Bashkortostan, Russia. The population was 9 as of 2010. There is 1 street.

Geography 
Speransky is located 34 km west of Ufa (the district's administrative centre) by road. Kolokoltsevo is the nearest rural locality.

References 

Rural localities in Ufimsky District